Predatory pricing is a pricing strategy, using the method of undercutting on a larger scale, where a dominant firm in an industry will deliberately reduce the prices of a product or service to loss-making levels in the short-term. The aim is that existing or potential competitors within the industry will be forced to leave the market, as they are unable to effectively compete with the dominant firm without making a loss. Once competition has been eliminated, the dominant firm now having a majority share of the market can raise its prices to monopoly levels in the long-term to recoup its losses.

The difference between predatory pricing and competitive pricing is during the recouping phase of lost profits by the dominant firm charging higher prices. With there being less firms in the market causing consumers to have fewer choices between products or services, these higher prices result in consumer harm. Predatory pricing usually causes consumer harm and is considered anti-competitive in many jurisdictions making the practice illegal under some competition laws.

Concept
Predatory pricing is split into a two-stage strategy.

First stage, is the predation, where the dominant firm offers a good or service at a below-cost rate, which reduces the firm's immediate profits in the short-term. This drop in price forces the price market for those goods or services to readjust to this lower price as an equilibrium, putting smaller firms and industry entrants at risk of closing and leaving the industry. The principle of this method is the dominant firm has the size and capital to sustain the short-term loss in profits, unlike new entrants and current players, thus forcing a game of survival that the dominant firm will typically win.

Second stage, is the recoupment, where the dominant firm readjusts its product and service prices close to monopoly prices (or monopoly price, depending on remaining industry players and the dominant firm's market share) to recover their losses in the long-term. This price adjustment can put consumers under pressure, as they are now forced to absorb it without the competition to offer a better price, resulting in consumer harm. This is what separates predatory price from normal competitive pricing. Under EU law, the European Commission can account for recoupment as a factor in determining whether predatory pricing is abusive. This is because predatory pricing can only be economically effective if a firm can recover its short-term losses from pricing below average variable costs (AVC). However, recoupment is not a precondition for establishing whether predatory pricing is an abuse of dominance under Article 102 TFEU. Assessing other factors, such as barriers to entry, can suffice to prove how the predatory pricing could foreclose competitors from the market.

The use of predatory pricing to capture a market in one territory while maintaining high prices in the suppliers' home market (also known as "dumping") creates a risk that the loss-making product will find its way back to the home market and drive down prices there.

Legal features
1. The principal part of predatory pricing is the operator in the seller's market, and the operator has certain economic or technical strength. This feature distinguishes it from price discrimination, which includes not only competition between sellers but also competition among buyers.

2. The geographical market of predatory pricing is the country's domestic market. This feature distinguishes it from "dumping". "Dumping" refers to the act of selling commodities in overseas markets at a lower price than the domestic market. It can be seen that these two have similarities in terms of "low-cost sales" and "exhaustion of competitors", but their differences are obvious.

(1) The scopes of application of the two are different. "Predatory pricing" applies to domestic trade, and "dumping" applies to international trade.
(
2) The standards for the identification of the two are different. "Predatory pricing" is based on cost, while "dumping" is based on the price applicable to the normal trading of domestic similar products.

(3) The laws applicable to both are different. "Predatory pricing" mainly applies to domestic laws, while "dumping" mainly applies to international treaties or the laws of other countries.

(4) The consequences of the two are different. Legal sanctions on “predatory pricing” are compensating damages or administrative penalties, while “dumping” is levying anti-dumping duties.

3. The objective performance of predatory pricing is a company temporarily sells goods or services below cost. Its essence is that it temporarily loses money, but squeezes competitors out of a certain market to form an exclusive situation. Then the predatory pricing company can sell goods and services at monopoly prices to make up for the losses from its low price sales.

4. A dominant firm's subjective intention may be to eliminate competition to gain a monopoly advantage. Under EU law, if a dominant firm prices above AVC but below average total costs (ATC), proving intention can be useful evidence for a finding of predatory pricing. However, it can be difficult to distinguish an intention to eliminate competitors from a legitimate intention to win competition. Therefore, the European Commission do not have to establish an undertaking's subjective intention to show Article 102 applies, especially as abuse is an “objective” rather than a subjective concept.

Implementation conditions
1.Sacrificing short-term profits

The economic theory of predatory pricing simply states that companies choose to make less profitable pricing in the short term, but it does not explicitly state that profits must be negative.  In anti-monopoly law enforcement, how to determine what level of pricing is predatory pricing becomes a problem in operation. In the anti-monopoly law enforcement, a clear standard is: During the period of predatory prices, the predator's profit is negative, or the price is lower than the cost. But the question here is what kind of cost can be used as a reference. The use of a price that is lower than the cost may make certain predatory pricing practices not legally binding. According to the theory of industrial organization, some predatory pricing practices may not lose money in the short term. However, in this particular case, the company's ability to make low-cost profits can only indicate that the company is a high-efficiency company compared to its competitors. Non-entry of entrants does not necessarily reduce benefits, and entry of entrants does not necessarily improve welfare. Anti-monopoly law ignores this and does not result in major welfare losses. In summary, although below-cost pricing does not summarize all predatory pricing practices, the cost of law enforcement mistakes it brings along may be very small.

2. The ability of incumbent company to raise prices

An important condition for predatory pricing is that a dominant firm can raise prices after excluding competitors to compensate for their short-term losses. To achieve this, market power can be an important factor. However, under EU law, market power is not necessary to establish predatory pricing, since other factors such as barriers to entry can indicate an abuse of a dominant position.

Theories for controlling predatory pricing
It can be difficult to identify when normal price competition turns into anti-competitive predatory pricing. Therefore, various rules and economic tests have been established to identify predatory pricing.

No rule
Especially according to  Easterbrook predatory pricing is rare, thus it should not be a central concern. Introducing laws for predation, especially because it is rare, could lead to generating false positive errors, which would interplay with the restriction of the rule. The main point within this argument is that government intervention is dispensable, as predation is unlikely to succeed, which creates a deterrent. This effect results by selling the products/services below the costs, which causes losses but without getting more market power. The market power doesn't increase in this case, because the market share holder weathers this predatory strategy. Thus, the firm punished itself by taking losses without gaining market. This is a deterrent for other firms. An additional argument against the implementation of rules is the inability of courts or competition authorities to differentiate predatory from competitive prices.

Short-run cost-based rules 
In 1975, Phillip Areeda and Donald Turner developed a short-run cost-based test, widely referred to as the ‘Areeda-Turner rule’. The rules are based on short term focus, even when the predatory-pricing strategy is a long-term strategy, because the long run would be inefficient, as it would be too speculative. The Areeda-Turner rule suggests prices at or above reasonable expected average variable costs (AVC) are presumed to be lawful, but prices below AVC are presumed to be unlawful and anti-competitive.

In EU law, the approach to testing for predatory pricing under Article 102 has been explained in a number of important cases.

In ECS/AKZO, the European Commission did not adopt the Areeda-Turner rule. The Court of Justice upheld this decision because other factors should also be considered alongside a cost-based analysis, such as plans that prove the dominant firm intended to eliminate competition. Instead, the Court in AKZO suggested that if a dominant firm sets prices below AVC, the predatory pricing is presumed to be predatory and abusive because the intention is to eliminate competitors rather than to maximise profits. If a dominant firm sets prices above AVC but below ATC, this is not presumed to be predatory but could be proven if there is evidence it is part of the dominant firm's plan to eliminate competition. If a dominant firm sets prices above ATC, it is usually not guilty of predatory pricing but this may be proven to be anti-competitive if it could lead to substantial consumer harm. The AKZO test was reaffirmed in Tetra Pak II, and France Télécom.

In Post Danmark I, the Court of Justice developed upon AKZO by holding prices above average incremental costs but below ATC would unlikely be abusive under Article 102 if there was no evidence the dominant firm deliberately intended to eliminate competition.

Long term cost-based rule
The long term cost-based rule is established by Posner. He assumes that long-run marginal costs are a more reliable test of predation than short run costs. The reason is that the predator (who prices at short-run marginal cost), could eliminate a competitor who can't afford losses in the short run. Posner argues too, that because of the hard determination of marginal costs, he would substitute average costs from the firm's  balance sheet to establish a test that relates to the full average costs based on the company's books. The test would include certain prerequisites, an intent element, as well as a defence. As a prerequisite Posner requires the plaintiff to demonstrate that the market was predestined for effective predatory pricing. As indicators Posner lists for instance that the predator operates in various markets, whereas the prey operates in less markets; concentrated market; slow entry; few fringe firms; homogenous products,  numerous buyers. Posner would authorize the firm to defend because of changes in supply or demand, so that the respondent firm could price its products at short run  marginal cost.

According to the European Commission's 'Guidance in Applying Article 102', if a dominant firm does not cover its average avoidable costs or long-run average incremental costs, this implies the dominant firm is operating at a loss in the short-term to foreclose equally efficient competitors from the market. The Guidance does not bind the EU Courts, but it is an important document that could influence future decisions.

Rules governing price increases after predation
William Baumol proposed a long-term rule, seeking to avoid full reliance on cost-based tests. Baumol's rule would require any price cut made in response to entry to continue for a five-year period after exit (i.e., if an incumbent firm cuts its price to drive out an entrant, the incumbent firm is prevented from increasing price for five years). This rule significantly diminishes the incentive of a firm to engage in predatory pricing, since the predatory firm can't reap the benefits of their anti-competitive behavior (monopoly profits). 
Baumol's proposed rule is not absolute, however. Baumol offers the predator some freedom to raise its post-exit price if the price increase is justified (e.g., by demonstrable changes in the firm's costs or market demand).

Further strategies

Industry-specific rules
Craswell and Fratrik suggest that establishing a legal standard to detect predatory pricing in the retail industry is unnecessary and should not amount to an antitrust violation. The primary reasoning was that predatory pricing requires strong barriers to entry to return profits in the long run, which does not exist in the retail grocery industry. When low-cost warehouse stores enter the market, supermarkets often reduce their prices to eliminate warehouse stores or discourage them from expansion. However, Craswell and Fratrik suggest that this may not be predatory pricing, but rather incumbent firms engaging in non-predatory price cuts required for ordinary competition.

Rule of reason test
Section 1 of the Sherman Act Antitrust Act of 1890 prohibits ‘every contract, combination in the form of trust or otherwise, or conspiracy, in restraint of trade or commerce.’ However, Courts have adopted the rule of reason test to analyse the effects of a restraint of trade on competition. Recent caselaw suggests that there is a four-step rule of reason test.  First, the plaintiff must demonstrate an ‘anti-competitive effect.’ Second, the defendant must show a ‘legitimate procompetitive justification.’ Third, the plaintiff must highlight that the restraint is not ‘reasonably necessary’ to achieve the defendant’s objectives or that there are ‘less restrictive alternatives.’ Fourth, the Court will balance the restraint of trade’s ‘anti-competitive effects with its pro-competitive justifications.’  Failure to satisfy any of these elements will defeat the anti-trust violation claim.

Output restriction rule 
Williamson offers the output restriction rule to restrain dominant firms from engaging in predatory pricing. The rule stipulates that upon the entry of a new firm in a market, a dominant firm cannot abuse their position by increasing their output above the pre-entry level.  A prevention period of 12 to 18 months should be adequate for new entrants to establish a market identity and understand economies of scale while disincentivising dominant firms from holding excess capacity.  Williamson suggests that the output restriction rule possesses greater welfare properties than the short-run marginal cost rule or short-run average cost rule.

Two tier approach 
Joskow and Klevorick offer a two-tier approach to identify predatory pricing. The first stage involves an analysis of the structural characteristics of the relevant market and the market power of the firm allegedly engaging in anti-competitive behaviour.  The plaintiff must demonstrate that the market in which the behaviour occurred would be prone to predatory pricing and cause losses in economic efficiency. The second stage involves behavioural considerations which may demonstrate predation such as the dominant firm pricing below average variable cost.

Legal aspects
In many countries there are legal restrictions upon using this pricing strategy, which may be deemed anti-competitive. It may not be technically illegal, but have severe restrictions.

Australia
Predatory pricing is illegal in Australia, the Trade Practices Act made the point of stating that the dominant firm has to have a significant quantity of the market share within the industry the dominant operates. The definition of what predatory prices in the Act states that the dominant firm has to employ the method of undercutting or underselling with the intention to force competitors or prevent entry to the industry. The dominant firm can only have significant quantity of market share to the industry if the firm is not substantially impacted or constrained by its competitors on suppliers and consumers.

In 2020, amendments to the Trade Practices Act 1993 created a new threshold test to prohibit those engaging in predatory pricing. The amendments, labelled the 'Birdsville Amendments' after Senator Barnaby Joyce, penned the idea in s46 to define the practice more liberally than other behavior by requiring the business first to have a 'substantial share of a market' (rather than substantial market power). This was made in a move to protect smaller businesses from situations where there are larger players, but each has market power.

Canada
Section 50 of the Competition Act, which criminalized predatory pricing, has been repealed and replaced by sections 78 and 79, which deal with the matters civilly.

Section 78(1)(i) of the Competition Act prohibits companies from the selling products at unreasonably low prices designed to facilitate or with the effect of eliminating competition or a competitor. The Competition Bureau has established Predatory Pricing Guidelines defining what is considered unreasonably low pricing.

United States
Predatory pricing practices may result in antitrust claims of monopolization or attempts to monopolize. Businesses with dominant or substantial market shares are more vulnerable to antitrust claims. However, because the antitrust laws are ultimately intended to benefit consumers, and discounting results in at least short-term net benefit to consumers, the U.S. Supreme Court has set high hurdles to antitrust claims based on a predatory pricing theory. The Court requires plaintiffs to show a likelihood that the pricing practices affect not only rivals, but also competition in the market as a whole—to establish there is a substantial probability of success of the attempt to monopolize. If there is a likelihood that market entrants will prevent the predator from recouping its investment through supra competitive pricing, then there is no probability of success and the antitrust claim would fail. In addition, the Court established that for prices to be predatory, they must be below the seller's cost.

The US Department of Justice, however, claims that modern economic theory based on strategic analysis supports predatory pricing as a real problem, and claims that the courts are out of date and too skeptical.

European Union
Article 102 of the Treaty on the Functioning of the European Union is the relevant statutory provision under EU law for dealing with predatory pricing. According to Article 102:“Any abuse by one or more undertakings of a dominant position within the internal market or in a substantial part of it shall be prohibited as incompatible with the internal market in so far as it may affect trade between Member States.”  If Article 102 is breached by a predatory pricing practice, the European Commission may intervene as they prioritise dealing with “exclusionary abuses” which exclude competitors from the market.  According to the 'Guidance in Applying Article 102''', the Commission normally intervene in possible predatory pricing cases if a dominant firm aims to maintain or strengthen its market power by "sacrificing" short-term losses to foreclose “as efficient” competitors, or even “less efficient” competitors. The "as efficient competitor" refers to a hypothetical competitor with the same costs as the dominant firm. The "as efficient competitor" test was endorsed in AKZO as the legal standard for assessing predatory pricing under Article 102.

India
The Competition Act, 2002 outlaws predatory pricing, treating it as an abuse of dominant position, prohibited under Section 4. Predatory pricing under the Act means the sale of goods or provision of services, at a price below cost, as may be determined by regulations, of production of the goods or provision of services, with a view to reduce competition or eliminate the competitors. A contravention of section 4 of the Act is anti-competitive per se, where there is no requirement to prove that the conduct had an anti-competitive effect on the market.

Russian Federation
Article 10 of the Federal Law No.135-FZ ‘On the Protection of Competition’ (FLPC) (Russian: ст. 10, Федерального закона от 26.07.2006 N 135-ФЗ "О защите конкуренции") deals with unilateral conduct of economic entities by prohibiting abuse of dominant position. The definition of such abuse, as stated in the article, includes   "the setting of an unjustified high or unjustified low price of a financial service by a financial entity".

All the matters connected with the abuse of the market power are handled by the Federal Antimonopoly Service of Russian Federation (FAS). The FAS investigates all alleged violations of the antimonopoly legislation and determines whether a dominant position has been exploited by one of the market participants.

United Kingdom
Section 18(1) of the Competition Act 1998 prohibits the abuse of a dominant position by 'one or more undertakings ... if it may affect trade within the United Kingdom’. This is commonly known as the ‘Chapter II prohibition’. The section is very similar to article 102 of the Treaty on the Functioning of the European Union governing the anti-monopoly laws within the EU jurisdiction, with the exception of parts regarding the effect on trade within the UK.

Germany
Sections 19 and 20 of the Act against Restraints of Competition (ARC) prohibit the abuse of a dominant position. Section 19 lists in more detail the entities with market power addressed by the Act. Article 102 of the Treaty on the Functioning of the European Union also applies, although it has some differences with the ARC.

Compliance with the Act is enforced by the German Federal Cartel Office (FCO) (German: Bundeskartellamt). With the FCO as the higher federal authority, there also exist state cartels in each of the federal states in Germany. The FCO is in the area of responsibility of the Federal Ministry for Economic Affairs and Energy (German: Bundesministerium für Wirtschaft und Energie).

 Austria
The European competition law art. 82 EC and § 5 KartG 2005 prohibit a market dominant enterprise, as well as a collective of several dominant enterprises, which intentionally suppressing a competitor or increasing their respective market share by using methods other than those of legal competitive performance. According to the law predatory pricing is in the one hand given if the market-dominat enterprise or enterprises controlling the local market, because it offers their products at prices, below their own average variable costs. In the other hand if the prices are below average total costs (fixed plus variable costs) but above average variable costs. If the market abuse is directed against the competitors, and not against suppliers and clients, the Austrian law provides provisions under  § 1UWG (in connection with §5 para. 1 KartG 2005, if there is a competitive relationship)  Furthermore, according to §1UWG  predatory pricing can be unconscionable if intended to harm competitors—even without the dominant company incurring losses. Moreover, predatory pricing can be unconscionable according to §1UWG  if the dominant firm expels enough competitors from the market to gain enough market share to dictate prices.

Denmark
According to §6, sec. 1, of the Competition Act (CA) entering into of anti-competitive agreements is prohibited.  The CA §6 corresponds to art. 81, sec. 1 of the EC- Treaty and prohibit predatory pricing.

Greece
Generally, Art. 1 (1) of the antitrust law (I. 703/1977) prohibits all agreements between undertakings, decisions by associations of undertakings, and concerted practices that strive to prevent, restrict, or distort competition in the Greek market. Particularly art. 2(1) of I 703/77 prohibits predatory pricing within Greece.

Sweden
According  to Art. 81 of the EC Treaty and sec. 6 of the Swedish Competition Act (KL) agreements between undertakings, which have as their issue or effect to distort competition is prohibited. Thus agreements regarding prices are prohibited per se.

 Criticism 
Some economists claim that true predatory pricing is a rare phenomenon claiming it is an irrational practice and that laws designed to prevent it only inhibit competition. According to the European Commission, this is because predatory pricing can cause firms to make a loss due to increased output. This stance was taken by the US Supreme Court in the 1993 case Brooke Group v. Brown & Williamson Tobacco, and the Federal Trade Commission has not successfully prosecuted any company for predatory pricing since.

Thomas Sowell explains one reason why predatory pricing may not be completely effective:Obviously, predatory pricing pays off only if the surviving predator can then raise prices enough to recover the previous losses, making enough extra profit thereafter to justify the risks. These risks are not small.However, even the demise of a competitor does not leave the survivor home free. Bankruptcy does not by itself destroy the fallen competitor's physical plant or the people whose skills made it a viable business. Both may be available-perhaps at distress prices-to others who can spring up to take the defunct firm's place.The Washington Post went bankrupt in 1933, though not because of predatory pricing. But neither its physical plant, its people, or its name disappeared into thin air. Instead, publisher Eugene Meyer acquired all three-at a fraction of what he had bid unsuccessfully for the same newspaper just four years earlier. In the course of time, the Post became the biggest newspaper in Washington.Critics of laws against predatory pricing may support their case empirically by arguing that there has been no instance where such a practice has actually led to a monopoly. Conversely, they argue that there is much evidence that predatory pricing has failed miserably. For example, Herbert Dow not only found a cheaper way to produce bromine but also defeated a predatory pricing attempt by the government-supported German cartel Bromkonvention, who objected to his selling in Germany at a lower price. Bromkonvention retaliated by flooding the US market with below-cost bromine, at an even lower price than Dow's. However, Dow simply instructed his agents to buy up at the very low price and then sell it back in Germany at a profit but still lower than Bromkonvention's price. In the end, the cartel could not keep up selling below cost and had to give in. That is used as evidence that the free market is a better way to stop predatory pricing than regulations such as anti-trust laws.

In another example of a successful defense against predatory pricing, a price war emerged between the New York Central Railroad (NYCR) and the Erie Railroad.  At one point, NYCR charged only a dollar per car for the transport of cattle. While the cattle cars quickly filled up, management were dismayed to find that Erie Railroad had also invested in the cattle-haulage business, making Erie a buyer of cattle transport, and was thus profiting from NYCR's losses.

Sowell argues:It is a commentary on the development of antitrust law that the accused must defend himself, not against actual evidence of wrongdoing, but against a theory which predicts wrongdoing in the future. It is the civil equivalent of "preventive detention" in criminal cases—punishment without proof.Support

An article written by heterodox economist Thomas DiLorenzo and published by the libertarian Cato Institute suggests that while a company might be able to successfully price other firms out of the market, there is no evidence to support the theory that the virtual monopoly could then raise prices since other firms would rapidly be able to enter the market and compete. Such entering demands substantial capital investments, which would not be repaid for a long time because of sharp price decreases, provoked by resumption of competition.

According to the Chicago school of thought advocated by Bork, predatory pricing is not always anti-competitive even if it ends up being a successful strategy. The Court in Post Danmark agreed predatory pricing does not always harm competition because competing “on the merits” to exclude less-efficient competitors can benefit consumers by providing lower prices and improved quality and choice of products and services.

The DG Competition's 'Discussion Paper' states predatory pricing can be justified as a rational strategy. This is why dominant firms can rebut presumptions of predatory pricing, despite prices falling below the “relevant cost benchmark”. For example, dominant undertakings could argue changing market conditions causing reduced demand but increased capacity meant below-cost pricing was necessary in the short-term to sell off fresh produce. Whilst this defence normally cannot be raised because predatory pricing is rarely the most efficient option, predatory pricing can still be a rational strategy.

Examples of alleged predatory pricing
In AKZO v Commission, AKZO were fined €10 million for abusing its dominant position in the organic peroxides market by reducing its prices to loss-making levels, preventing English firm ‘ECS’ from competing on the polymer market.
In Tetra Pak v Commission, Tetra Pak were fined €75 million for abusing its dominant position by reducing prices of non-asceptic cartons.
In Wanadoo Interactive, a €10.35 million fine was imposed on France Télécom's subsidiary, Wanadoo Interactive. Based on AKZO, high-speed residential broadband internet services were priced at levels below AVC until August 2001, and later at around AVC but below ATC.
 In ACCC v Cabcharge Australia Ltd, Cabcharge were fined $3 million for engaging in predatory pricing conduct by supplying taxi meters that were below cost and fare schedule updates at no charge.  This breached section 46(1) of the Trade Practices Act 1974. 
 In MCX v NSE, the NSE abused its dominant position in the currency derivatives segment by waiving transaction and admission fees, thus preventing MCX from competing in the market.  This breached section 4 of the Competition Act, 2002 and amounted to a Rs 55.5 crore penalty. 
According to an AP article a law in Minnesota forced Walmart to increase its price for a one-month supply of the prescription birth control pill Tri-Sprintec from $9.00 to $26.88.
According to a New York Times article the German government ordered Walmart to increase its prices.
According to an International Herald Tribune article, the French government ordered amazon.com to stop offering free shipping to its customers because it violated French predatory pricing laws. After Amazon refused to obey the order, the government proceeded to fine them €1,000 per day. Amazon continued to pay the fines instead of ending its policy of offering free shipping. After a law was created explicitly banning free shipping, Amazon started charging one cent for delivery. 
In the Darlington Bus War, Stagecoach Group offered free bus rides to put the rival Darlington Corporation Transport out of business.<span style="visibility:hidden">
Some have accused Amazon of using predatory pricing to undercut competitors such as Quidsi before offering to buy them out at low cost once their financial future had become bleak.
Sir Freddie Laker, founder of Laker Airways, sued IATA member airlines British Airways, BCal, Pan Am, TWA, Lufthansa, Air France, Swissair, KLM, SAS, Sabena, Alitalia and UTA for conspiracy to put his airline out of business by predatory pricing. They settled out of court for US$50 million, with British Airways later agreeing to contribute a further $35 million. British Airways also reached a separate out-of-court agreement with Sir Freddie personally for £8 million.

See also
 Penetration pricing
 Price skimming
 Herbert Henry Dow
 Dumping
 Externality
 Price discrimination
 Robinson–Patman Act (US Federal law passed in 1936)
 Contestable market
 Limit price
 Low-ball

References

 EU Primary Sources Cited 

 Article 102 TFEU
 ECS/AKZO (IV/30.698) Commission decision of 14 December 1985
 Case 202/07 P, France Télécom SA v Commission of the European Communities [2009] ECR I-2369
 Case 85/76, Hoffmann-La Roche & Co. AG v Commission of the European Communities [1979] ECR II-00461
 Case 209/10, Post Danmark A/S v Konkurrencerådet [2012] EU:C:2012:172Case 333/94 P, Tetra Pak International SA v Commission of the European Communities [1996] ECR I-5951
 Case 62/86, AKZO Chemie BV v Commission of the European Communities [1991] ECR I-03359
 Case C-23/14, Post Danmark A/S v Konkurrencerådet EU:C:2015:651
 Wanadoo Interactive (Case COMP/38.233) Commission decision of 16 July 2003

 Works Cited 

 Areeda, Phillip; Turner, Donald (1975). Predatory Pricing and Related Practices under Section 2 of the Sherman Act. Harvard Law Review. 88: 697–733 – via JSTOR.
 Bork, Robert (1993). The Antitrust Paradox: A Policy At War With Itself. Simon & Schuster. .
 DG Competition Discussion Paper on the Application of Article 82 of the Treaty to Exclusionary Abuses. Brussels: European Commission. 2005. Retrieved April 22, 2020.
 Ekaterina, Rousseva (2010). Rethinking Exclusionary Abuses in EU Competition Law. Hart Publishing. .
 Guidance on the Commission's Enforcement Priorities in Applying Article 82 of the EC Treaty to Abusive Exclusionary Conduct by Dominant Undertakings. European Commission. February 24, 2009. Retrieved April 22, 2020.
 Jones, Alison; Sufrin, Brenda; Dunne, Niamh (2019). Jones & Sufrin's EU Competition Law: Text, Cases, and Materials. Oxford University Press. .
 Whish, Richard; Bailey, David (2018). Competition Law. Oxford University Press. .  
 Predatory Pricing''. OECD. 1989. Retrieved April 22, 2020.

External links
 Predatory Legislature, by William L. Anderson, Ph.D. Professor of Economics
 Predatory Pricing Laws: Hazardous to Consumers Health, by Donald J. Boudreaux, Ph.D. Economics
 Predatory Pricing: Strategic Theory and Legal Policy, Patrick Bolton, Ph.D. Professor of Finance and Economics
 3M Company FKA Minnesota Mining and Manufacturing Company v. LePage's Incorporated, et al., U.S. Supreme Court No. 02-1865
 EU court upholds antitrust fine against France Telecom unit
 FTC Staff Concludes that Alabama Motor Fuels Marketing Act Restricts Competition, Re: The Alabama Motor Fuels Marketing Act
 Predatory Pricing Report

Anti-competitive practices
Commercial crimes
Monopoly (economics)
Pricing controversies
Ethically disputed business practices
Abuse

de:Kampfpreisunterbietung
Competition law